The men's 500 metres at the 1990 Asian Winter Games was held on 10 March 1990 in Sapporo, Japan.

Records

Results

References
Results

External links
Changchun 2007 Official website

Men 500